The Subachoque Formation (Q1su) is a geological formation of the Bogotá savanna, Altiplano Cundiboyacense, Eastern Ranges of the Colombian Andes. The formation consists mainly of sandy shales and lignite with sandstone beds. It is the lowermost formation of the lacustrine and fluvio-glacial sediments of Lake Humboldt.

Etymology 
The formation was first defined and named by Helmens and Van der Hammen in 1995 after Subachoque, Cundinamarca.

Description

Lithologies 
The Subachoque Formation consists mainly of sandy shales, some organic, with lignite and sandstone beds.

Stratigraphy and depositional environment 
The Subachoque Formation is the lowermost of the lagunal and alluvial sequence of the Bogotá savanna. In parts, it conformably overlies the Tilatá Formation and other parts unconformably the Cretaceous Guadalupe Group and the Paleogene Guaduas, Cacho, Bogotá, and Regadera Formations. The Subachoque Formation is overlain by other Quaternary deposits of Lake Humboldt. The age has been estimated to be Early to Middle Pleistocene based on fission track analysis, with reported ages between 2.5 and 1 Ma. The depositional environment has been interpreted as lacustrine and fluvio-glacial with alluvial fans.

Outcrops 

The Subachoque Formation is found at its type locality in the western flank of the synclinal of Subachoque and in the western flank of the synclinal of Guasca. The deposition of the Subachoque Formation postdates the main reverse movement of the Bogotá Fault.

Regional correlations

See also 

 Geology of the Eastern Hills
 Geology of the Ocetá Páramo
 Geology of the Altiplano Cundiboyacense

Notes

References

Bibliography

Maps

Further reading

External links 
 

Geologic formations of Colombia
Pleistocene Colombia
Sandstone formations
Shale formations
Deltaic deposits
Fluvial deposits
Glacial deposits
Lacustrine deposits
Formations
Geography of Cundinamarca Department
Geography of Bogotá
Muysccubun